Geumsan Insam Cello is a UCI Continental cycling team from South Korea, founded in 2010.

Team roster

Major wins

2010
Stage 5 Tour de Langkawi, Anuar Manan
Stage 2 & 3 Tour of Thailand, Anuar Manan
Stage 2 Tour de Korea, Yoo Ki-Hong
 Time Trial Championships, Shinichi Fukushima
Stage 2 Tour of East Java, Anuar Manan
Overall Tour de Okinawa, Shinichi Fukushima
Stage 2, Shinichi Fukushima
2011
Stage 7 Tour de Korea, Yoo Ki-Hong
 Time Trial Championships, Choe Hyeong-Min
2016
 Time Trial Championships, Choe Hyeong-Min
2018
Stage 1 Tour de Korea, Choe Hyeong-min

National champions
2010
 Japan Time Trial, Shinichi Fukushima
2011
 Korean Time Trial, Choe Hyeong-Min
2016
  Korean Time Trial, Choe Hyeong-Min

References

External links

Team Guemsan Ginseng Asia's 2010 Team List in Cycling Archives

UCI Continental Teams (Asia)
Cycling teams based in South Korea
Cycling teams established in 2010